The Government of Barbados (GoB), is a unitary parliamentary republic, where the President of Barbados represents as the head of state and the Prime Minister of Barbados represents as the head of government.

Structure

The country has a bicameral legislature and a political party system, based on universal adult suffrage and fair elections. The Senate has 21 members, appointed by the President, 12 on the advice of the Prime Minister, two on the advice of the Leader of the Opposition, and seven at the President's sole discretion. The House of Assembly has 30 members, all elected. Both houses debate all legislation. However, the House of Assembly may override Senate's rejection of money bills and other bills except bills amending the Constitution.

Officers of each house (President and Deputy President of the Senate; Speaker, Deputy Speaker, and Chairman of Committees of the Assembly) are elected from the members of the respective houses.

In keeping with the Westminster system of governance, Barbados has evolved into an independent parliamentary democracy, meaning that all political power rests with the Parliament under a non-political President as head of state. Executive authority is vested in the President, who normally acts only on the advice of the Prime Minister and Cabinet, who are collectively responsible to Parliament. Barbadian law is rooted in English common law, and the Constitution of Barbados implemented in 1966, is the supreme law of the land.

Fundamental rights and freedoms of the individual are set out in the Constitution and are protected by a strict legal code.

The Cabinet is headed by the Prime Minister, who must be an elected member of Parliament, and other ministers are appointed from either chamber by the President, as advised by the Prime Minister.

The President appoints as Leader of the Opposition the member of House of Assembly who commands the support of the largest number of members of that House in opposition to the ruling party's government.

The maximum duration of a Parliament is five years from the first sitting. There is a simultaneous dissolution of both Houses of Parliament by the President, acting on the advice of the Prime Minister.

There is an established non-political civil service. Also, there are separate constitutional commissions for the Judicial and Legal Service, the Public Service, and the Police Service.

History

The government has been chosen by elections since 1961 elections, when Barbados achieved full self-governance. Before then, the government was a Crown colony consisting of either colonial administration solely (such as the Executive Council), or a mixture of colonial rule and a partially elected assembly, such as the Legislative Council.

Between 1966 and 2021, the head of state of Barbados was the Monarchy of Barbados represented by the Governor-General of Barbados as its representative. After decades of republicanism, the monarchy was abolished and replaced with a new head of state office, the President of Barbados, on 30 November 2021. 

Since independence the Democratic Labour Party (DLP) held office 1966 to 1976, from 1986 to 1994, and from January 2008 to 2018. The Barbados Labour Party (BLP) governed from 1976 to 1986, from September 1994–2008 and has formed the government from 2018–Present.

Executive branch 

The Executive Branch of government conducts the ordinary business of government. These functions are called out by the Prime Minister and cabinet ministers. The prime minister chooses the ministers of government they wish to have in the cabinet but they are actually appointed by the President.
Heads of State
 President
Head of Government
 Prime Minister
 Attorney General's
 Ministers

Source: St.Lucia Times

Source:  St.Lucia Times

Source:  BGIS

Legislative Branch 
Under Barbados' version of the Westminster system of government, the executive and legislative branches are partly intertwined.
The only official Cabinet office (other than Prime Minister) expressly mentioned in the Constitution of Barbados is Office of the Attorney-General.
 President
 Chief Secretaries (Abolished)
 Auditors-General
 Senators
 Presidents of the Senate
 Members of the House ( a/k/a Members of Parliament)
 Speakers of the House of Assembly
 Clerks of Parliament

Law 
The Constitution of Barbados is the supreme law of the nation. The Attorney General heads the independent judiciary. Historically, Barbadian law was based entirely on English common law with a few local adaptations. At the time of independence, the Parliament of the United Kingdom lost its ability to legislate for Barbados, but the existing English and British common law and statutes in force at that time, together with other measures already adopted by the Barbadian Parliament, became the basis of the new country's legal system.

Legislation may be shaped or influenced by such organisations as the United Nations, the Organization of American States, or other international bodies to which Barbados has obligatory commitments by treaty. Additionally, through international co-operation, other institutions may supply the Barbados Parliament with key sample legislation to be adapted to meet local circumstances before enacting it as local law.

New acts are passed by the Barbadian Parliament and require approval by the President to become law. The President, has the power to "withhold assent" from laws by vetoing the proposed law without parliamentary override.

Judicial branch 

The judiciary is the legal system through which punishments are handed out to individuals who break the law. The functions of the judiciary are to enforce laws; to interpret laws; to conduct court hearings; to hear court appeals.

The local court system of Barbados is made up of:
Magistrates' Courts: Covering Criminal, Civil, Domestic, Domestic Violence, and Juvenile matters. But can also take up matters dealing with Coroner's Inquests, Liquor Licences, and civil marriages. Further, the Magistrates' Courts deal with Contract and Tort law where claims do not exceed $10,000.00.
The Supreme Court: is made up of High Court and Court of Appeals.
High Court: Consisting of Civil, Criminal, and Family law divisions.
Court of Appeal: Handles appeals from the High Court and Magistrates' Court. It hears appeals in both the civil, and criminal law jurisdictions. It may consist of a single Justice of Appeal sitting in Chambers; or may sit as a Full Court of three Justices of Appeals.
The Caribbean Court of Justice (CCJ), (based in Port of Spain, Trinidad and Tobago), is the court of last resort (final jurisdiction) over Barbadian law. It replaced the London-based Judicial Committee of the Privy Council (JCPC). The CCJ may resolve other disputed matters dealing with the Caribbean Single Market and Economy (CSME).
 Chief Justices
 Justices of Appeals
 Magistrates

Perception
Transparency International ranked Barbados as 29th place (of 180) in the world on its Corruption Perceptions Index in 2021, being the least corrupt country in the Caribbean.

See also 
 Politics of Barbados
 Monarchy of Barbados
 Parliament of Barbados
 Prime Minister of Barbados
 Cabinet of Barbados
 List of government budgets by country
 List of countries by tax revenue as percentage of GDP

References

Further reading

Gallery

External links 

 Barbadian Government Website
 The Barbados Governmental System, Photius Coutsoukis
 Barbados Government statement on the proper titles for members of Government
Social Security provided by the Government of Barbados
Laws of Barbados, The World Law Guide
Laws of Barbados, The World Intellectual Property Organization

 
Barbados
 
Barbados politics-related lists